The Bangladesh Computer Council (BCC) is a statutory government organization operating under the Information and Communication Technology Division of the Ministry of Posts, Telecommunications and Information Technology of the Government of Bangladesh (GoB). It was established by the Parliament under Act No IX of 1990. The BCC's headquarters are situated in Agargaon, Dhaka, Bangladesh.

The primary mission of the Bangladesh Computer Council is to promote and support activities related to Information and Communication Technology (ICT). This includes formulating national ICT strategies and policies, creating standards and specifications for ICT tools used by government organizations, and working towards the development of human resources in the ICT sector.

Bangladesh Computer Council operates a tier III certified national data center in Bangladesh. This data center provides secure and reliable storage and management of digital data for various government agencies and other organizations in the country.

The ICT Division of Bangladesh Computer Council is building a tier IV (most reliable) National Data Center (4TDC) at Bangabandhu Hi-Tech City, Kaliakoir, Gazipur with the help of the Chinese Government. This data center will be equipped with cloud computing and G-cloud (e-Governance through cloud computing) technology.

History
In 1983, the National Computer Council was formed by the government of Bangladesh. The name was changed to the Bangladesh Computer Council in 1990 by the Bangladesh Computer Council Ordinance. It falls under the Information Technology (ICT) division of the Ministry of Posts, Telecommunications and Information and provides support and services to 661 government organizations and agencies.

In 2016, the BCC launched eshikkha.net to teach computer programming in Bengali. The Bangladeshi government awarded the BCC a contract worth over 12 billion taka (US$149 million in February 2017) to connect 2,600 union councils to the internet via fiber optic cable.

References

1983 establishments in Bangladesh
Government agencies of Bangladesh
Organisations based in Dhaka
Information technology in Bangladesh